649 Josefa is a minor planet orbiting the Sun.

References

External links
 
 

Background asteroids
Josefa
Josefa
Sq-type asteroids (SMASS)
19070911